Lady Be Good was a 1928 American silent romantic comedy film directed by Richard Wallace. The film is based on the 1924 musical of the same name by George Gershwin and starred Jack Mulhall and Dorothy Mackaill.

Cast
 Jack Mulhall as "Mysterio" the magician
 Dorothy Mackaill as his assistant
 John Miljan as Murray
 Nita Martan as Madison
 Dot Farley as Texas West
 James Finlayson as Trelawney West
 Aggie Herring as Landlady
 Jay Eaton as Dancer
 Eddie Clayton as Dancer
 Yola d'Avril as Assistant
 Don Charno and His Martini Orchestra (uncredited)
 Charlie Hall as Backstage Actor in Blackface (uncredited)

Preservation status
The film is now considered a lost film.

References

External links
 
 Progressive Silent Film List: Lady Be Good at silentera.com
 

1928 films
1928 romantic comedy films
American romantic comedy films
American silent feature films
American black-and-white films
Films based on musicals
Films directed by Richard Wallace
First National Pictures films
Lost American films
1920s American films
Silent romantic comedy films
Silent American comedy films